Nami Yayak was a Turkish fencer. He competed in the individual and team sabre events at the 1928 Summer Olympics.

References

External links
 

Year of birth missing
Year of death missing
Turkish male sabre fencers
Olympic fencers of Turkey
Fencers at the 1928 Summer Olympics